Maida Vale is an affluent residential district consisting of the northern part of Paddington in West London, west of St John's Wood and south of Kilburn. It is also the name of its main road, on the continuous Edgware Road. Maida Vale is part of the City of Westminster, 3.1 miles (5.0 km) north-west of Charing Cross. It has many late Victorian and Edwardian blocks of mansion flats. The area is home to the BBC Maida Vale Studios.

Name
The name derives from a pub called The Maida, the hanging board of which used to show a likeness of Sir John Stuart, under which was the legend Sir John Stuart, the hero of Maida. General Sir John Stuart was made Count of Maida, a town in Calabria, by King Ferdinand IV of Naples and III of Sicily, after victory at the Battle of Maida in 1806.

The pub stood on Edgware Road near the Regent's Canal until about 2000. In recent years, a different pub (formerly The Truscott Arms) has been renamed The Hero of Maida, but is in a different location.

Geography

It makes up most of the W9 postal district.

The southern part of Maida Vale, at the junction of Paddington Basin with Regent's Canal with many houseboats, is known as Little Venice. Paddington Recreation Ground is also located in Maida Vale.

The area to the south-west of Maida Vale, at the western end of Elgin Avenue, where it meets Harrow Road, was historically known as "Maida Hill", as a recognised postal district bounded by the Avenues on the west, the Regent's Canal to the south, Maida Vale to the east and Kilburn Lane to the north. Parts of Maida Vale were also included in this. The name "Maida Hill" had fallen out of use, but was resurrected since the mid-2000s by way of the 414 bus route (which from 2005 to 2021 gave its destination as Maida Hill and terminated on Shirland Road), and a new street market on the Piazza at the junction of Elgin Avenue and Harrow Road.

Just to the east of Maida Vale is St John's Wood, with Lord's Cricket Ground.

History
The area was originally owned by the Church, initially as part of St Margaret's, Westminster, then later by the Bishop of London after the Dissolution of the Monasteries.

In 1742, a lease for future development was signed by Sir John Frederick. His daughter later married Robert Thistlethwaite, a Hampshire landowner, whose Hampshire holdings including Widley and Wymering are commemorated in Maida Vale street names.

In 1816, an Act of Parliament allowed the trustees of Sir John Frederick's estate and the Bishop of London to begin developing the area. This began in the 1820s with development along Edgware Road. The area was first named on maps as Maida Vale in 1827. John Gutch, surveyor to the Bishop of London, produced a plan for the area in 1827, which roughly corresponds to current road alignments.

By 1868, a stretch of Edgware Road near the area had been officially named Maida Vale. In 1960, the ownership of the area's freehold passed from the Bishop of London to the Ecclesiastical Commissioners, whose function was to administer the church's assets.

In the late 19th and early 20th centuries, Maida Vale was a significant Sephardic Jewish district, to the extent that an 1878 magazine report reported that it was commonly called "New Jerusalem". The 1896 Spanish & Portuguese Synagogue, a Grade II listed building and headquarters of the British Sephardi community, is on Lauderdale Road. The actor Alec Guinness was born on this road. The first Prime Minister of Israel, David Ben-Gurion, lived within sight of this synagogue on Warrington Crescent. The pioneer of modern computing, Alan Turing, was born at what is now the Colonnade Hotel in Warrington Crescent.

Maida Vale tube station was opened on 6 June 1915 on the Bakerloo line. Warwick Avenue tube station on the same line had been opened a few months earlier.

BBC Studios

Maida Vale is home to some of BBC network radio's recording and broadcast studios. The building on Delaware Road is one of the BBC's earliest premises, pre-dating Broadcasting House, and was the centre of the BBC radio news service during World War II. The building houses seven music and radio drama studios. Most famously it was home to John Peel's BBC Radio 1 Peel Sessions and the BBC Radiophonic Workshop.

In 2018 the BBC announced plans to close the Maida Vale studios and relocate its functions to East London.

Little Venice

Little Venice is a comparatively recent name for parts of Maida Vale and Paddington in the City of Westminster. It consists of the area surrounding the Little Venice basin and its canals. It is known for its Regency style white stucco buildings and its canals and moored boats. The name Little Venice is applied to Maida Avenue, Warwick Crescent and Blomfield Road, and the streets in the south of Maida Vale overlooking Browning's Pool, including the section of Randolph Avenue south of Warrington Crescent.

According to one story, the poet Robert Browning, who lived in the area from 1862 to 1887, coined the name. However, this was disputed by Lord Kinross in 1966 and by London Canals. Both assert that Lord Byron (1788–1824) humorously coined the name, which now applies more loosely to a longer reach of the canal system. Browning's Pool is named after the poet. It forms the junction of Regent's Canal and the Paddington Arm of the Grand Union Canal.

South Maida Vale, a prime residential area, also has a reputation for shops and restaurants and for the Canal Cafe Theatre, the Puppet Theatre Barge, the Waterside Café and the Warwick Castle pub. A waterbus service operates from Little Venice eastwards round Regent's Park, calling at London Zoo and on towards Camden Town. The Inland Waterways Association has hosted since 1983 a Canalway Cavalcade in Little Venice.

Other areas

Maida Vale is noted for wide tree-lined avenues, large communal gardens and red-brick mansion blocks from the late Victorian and Edwardian eras. The first mansion blocks were completed in 1897, with the arrival of the identically designed Lauderdale Mansions South, Lauderdale Mansions West and Lauderdale Mansions East in Lauderdale Road. Others followed in neighbouring streets: Elgin Mansions (Elgin Avenue) and Leith Mansions (Grantully Road) in 1900, Ashworth Mansions (Elgin Avenue and Grantully Road) and Castellain Mansions (Castellain Road) in 1902, Elgin Court (Elgin Avenue) and Carlton Mansions (Randolph Avenue) in 1902, Delaware Mansions (Delaware Road) and Biddulph Mansions (Elgin Avenue and Biddulph Road) in 1907 and Randolph Court in 1910.

Among the buildings of architectural interest is the Carlton Tavern, a pub on Carlton Vale. Built in 1920–1921 for Charrington Brewery, it is thought to be the work of the architect Frank J. Potter and is noted for its 1920s interiors and faience tiled exterior. The building was being considered by Historic England for Grade II listing when it was unexpectedly demolished in March 2015 by the property developer CLTX Ltd to make way for a block of flats. The pub was subsequently rebuilt and re-opened following a community campaign and planning appeals.

Demography
Maida Vale has a namesake electoral ward and in the 2022 local election returned three Labour councillors for Westminster City Council. The 2011 census counted a population of 10,210 in the ward. Ethnicity-wise, 62.4% of the population were White (38% British, 3% Irish, 22% Other), 11.7% were Asian, and 7.1% were Black. Maida Vale also had a large Arab community, who formed 9.2% of the population, and by far the most spoken foreign language was Arabic. Of the 4,480 households, the number of homes owned or privately rented were about even, with socially rented a bit less but still significant. Properties are predominantly in the flats/maisonettes/apartments category (over 90 percent of the households). The median age was 33. Being in the inner city, the majority of residents do not own a car or van.

Religion
The principal church in Kilburn is St Augustine's, sometimes referred to as "The Cathedral of North London"; the area is also served by St Mark's parish church, Hamilton Terrace and by St Saviour's Church, Warwick Avenue, a building constructed in 1972–1976 in a "modern" style. The latter building was referred to by some local residents as "the God Box". Between 1870 and 1906, the incumbent at St Mark's was Robinson Duckworth.

Lauderdale Road Synagogue, a Sephardic Jewish place of worship, is in Maida Vale. Saatchi Shul, an independent Orthodox Jewish synagogue, was founded in Maida Vale in 1998.

In popular culture

Scenes from the 1988 film A Fish Called Wanda were filmed in the area.
Several scenes from Paddington (2014) were filmed in Maida Vale, including using the tube station (mocked up to appear to be the fictional 'Westbourne Oak' station) and a police chase on Castellain Road.
In the television adaptation of Ian McEwan's novel The Child in Time, the family was depicted as living in Maida Vale and several of the exterior scenes were shot around Elgin Avenue.
Scenes from The Mummy (2017) starring Tom Cruise were shot in the Warrington pub in Maida Vale.
The film Disobedience (2017) was shot at the Lauderdale Road Synagogue.
Scenes for film In Darkness (2018) starring Natalie Dormer were filmed at a flower shop (made to appear to be a coffee shop) on Lauderdale Parade.
Scenes from The Romanoffs TV series (2018) were filmed at the site of Kindred Studios in 2018.

Maida Vale has also been referenced in several films and television programmes:
In Season 4 of Downton Abbey, Lady Edith says she is having an abortion because "I don't want to be an outcast. I don't want to be some funny woman living in Maida Vale people never talk about."
Maida Vale is where most of the action takes place in Dial M for Murder, both the 1954 Alfred Hitchcock film, and the original play written by Frederick Knott. Specifically, there are numerous references to the Maida Vale police who investigate the murder.

Notable people

Commemorative plaques

Ordered by birth date
Andreas Kalvos (1792–1869), Greek poet and patriot, at 182 Sutherland Avenue.
Ambrose Fleming (1849–1945), English electrical engineer and physicist, at 9 Clifton Gardens.
David Ben-Gurion (1886–1973), first prime minister of Israel, at 75 Warrington Crescent.
Lupino Lane (1892–1959), theatre and film star, at 32 Maida Vale.
Henry Hall (1898-1989), British dance band leader, at 8 Randolph Mews in 1959-1981.
Edward Ardizzone (1900–1979), artist and illustrator, at 130 Elgin Avenue.
Lennox Berkeley (1900-1989), composer, lived at 8 Warwick Avenue.
Alan Turing (1912–1954), code-breaker and pioneer of computer science, at 2 Warrington Crescent.
Alec Guinness (1914–2000), English actor, born at 155 Lauderdale Mansions.
Arthur Lowe (1915–1982), English actor, famed for his role as Captain George Mainwaring in the television show Dad's Army, at 2 Maida Hill West in 1969–1982.
Roger Bannister (1929–2018), English athlete and neurologist, trained to break the 4-minute mile at the track in Paddington Rec while a medical student at St Mary's hospital.
Tony Meehan (1943–2005), founder member of the guitar group The Shadows, lived at 34 Lauderdale Mansions in 1977–2005.

Other notables

Ordered by birth date where given, followed by those for whom no birth date is given. See also People from Maida Vale
Sir John Tenniel (1820–1914), artist and cartoonist, at 10 Portsdown Road, Maida Hill in 1854–1909.
John Lawrence Toole (1830–1906), comic actor, lived in Maida Vale.
James Payn (1830–1898), novelist and journal editor, died at his home, 43 Warrington Crescent, on 25 March 1898.
Joanna Mary Boyce (1831–1861), portrait painter, born in Maida Vale.
Charles Coborn (1852-1945), music hall entertainer, lived at 27 Elgin Mansions.
Sir Edward German (1862–1936), composer, lived at 5 Biddulph Road from 1921 until his death in 1936.
George Arliss (1868–1946), actor, at 1 Clifton Villas.
Leslie Green (1875–1908), architect, was born in Maida Vale.
John Masefield (1878–1967), novelist, playwright and Poet Laureate from 1930, at 30 Maida Avenue.
Lieutenant Leonard Keysor VC (1885–1951), Australian soldier, born in Maida Vale.
Clifford Grey (1887–1941), musical theatre composer, at 38 Sandringham Court.
Esmé Percy (1887–1957), actor, at 30 Warrington Crescent.
Philip Guedalla (1889–1944), writer, politician and barrister, born in Maida Vale.
Vera Brittain (1893–1970), writer, at 111 Wymering Mansions, Wymering Road.
Victor Gollancz (1893–1967), publisher and humanitarian, born at 256 Elgin Avenue, Maida Vale.
Konni Zilliacus (1894–1967), Labour MP for Manchester Gorton and author.
Irene Handl (1901–1987), character actress, born in Maida Vale.
Terence Fisher (1904–1980), film director, born in Maida Vale.
Nancy Mitford (1904–1973), author, at 13 Blomfield Road in the 1930s.
Lou Preager (1906–1978), British dance band leader, at 198 Wymering Mansions, Wymering Road in the 1930s.
James MacColl (1908–1971), Labour MP for Widnes, at 21 Randolph Road.
Hardy Amies (1909–2003), fashion designer, dressmaker to Queen Elizabeth II.
Walter Kolarz (1912–1962), communist scholar, in Maida Vale from 1940 until his death.
Ernest Clark (1912–1994), actor, born and raised in Maida Vale.
Helen Clare (1916–2018), singer, was living at 88 Maida Vale in 1939.
Alan Freeman (1927–2006), broadcaster.
Mstislav Rostropovich (1927-2007), cellist, at 18 Randolph Crescent.
Enrica Soma (1929–1969), Italian-American socialite and ballerina, one-time wife of John Huston and mother of Anjelica Huston, moved there with her children in 1962 after separating from her husband.
Ruth Rendell (1930–2015), Baroness Rendell of Babergh, the English crime novelist, lived in the area.
Alexander Walker (1930–2003), Evening Standard film critic, at 1 Marlborough, 38–40 Maida Vale.
Joan Collins (b. 1933) grew up in Maida Vale.
John Inman (1935–2007), actor, lived in a mews house in Little Venice for 30 years.
Eddie Linden (b. 1935), poet and founder of Aquarius magazine, which he edited from his home in Maida Vale.
Delia Derbyshire (1937–2001), in Clifton Road during her time with the BBC Radiophonic Workshop.
Edward Fox (b. 1937), film actor, has lived in Maida Avenue, by the Regent's Canal, from the 1970s to the present-day.
 Philip Lawrence (1947-1995), head teacher at St George's Catholic School in Maida Vale at the time of his murder in December 1995.
Joe Strummer (1952–2002) of punk rock band The Clash lived there.
Jimmy McCulloch (1953–1979) of the rock band Wings died of a heroin overdose at his flat there.
Elizabeth Emanuel (b. 1953), fashion designer, lives in the area.
Michael Flatley (b. 1958), dancer and creator of Riverdance etc., owned a house in Park Place Villas, near the Regent's Canal, until 2004.
Jarvis Cocker (b. 1963) of Pulp was living in the area in 1997.
Charles Spencer, 9th Earl Spencer (b. 1964), peer, author and younger brother of Diana, Princess of Wales, has a residence in Maida Vale.
Björk (b. 1965), Icelandic singer, resident in the 1990s and early 2000s.
Ben Miller (b. 1966), comedian and actor.
Noel Gallagher (b. 1967), singer, songwriter and guitarist.
Bradley Wiggins (b. 1980), cyclist.
Eva Green (b. 1980), actress.
Mohammed Emwazi (1988–2015), alleged executioner for Islamic State known as "Jihadi John", attended St Mary Magdalene Church of England Primary School in Maida Vale.
Abdel-Majed Abdel Bary (b. 1991), suspected Islamist militant.
Daisy Ridley (b. 1992), actress.
Kate Stewart (b. 1995), singer-songwriter.

Education

References

External links

 
Areas of London
Districts of the City of Westminster
Streets in the City of Westminster